Senator Willis may refer to:

Members of the United States Senate
Frank B. Willis (1871–1928), U.S. Senator from Ohio from 1921 to 1928
Raymond E. Willis (1875–1956), U.S. Senator from Indiana from 1941 to 1947

United States state senate members
Charles T. Willis (1841–1921), New York State Senate
Edwin E. Willis (1904–1972), Louisiana State Senate
Parish L. Willis (1838–1917), Oregon State Senate
R. Holman Willis (1880–1954), Virginia State Senate
William Willis (Maine politician) (1794–1870), Maine State Senate